The following is a partial list of the "C" codes for Medical Subject Headings (MeSH), as defined by the United States National Library of Medicine (NLM).

This list continues the information at List of MeSH codes (C11). Codes following these are found at List of MeSH codes (C13). For other MeSH codes, see List of MeSH codes.

The source for this content is the set of 2006 MeSH Trees from the NLM.

– urologic and male genital diseases

– fournier gangrene

– genital diseases, male

– epididymitis

– genital neoplasms, male
  – penile neoplasms
  – prostatic neoplasms
  – testicular neoplasms
  – sertoli-leydig cell tumor

– hematocele

– hemospermia

– herpes genitalis

– hydrocele

– infertility
  – infertility, male
  – oligospermia

– penile diseases
  – balanitis
  – hypospadias
  – penile induration
  – penile neoplasms
  – phimosis
  – paraphimosis
  – priapism

– prostatic diseases
  – prostatic hyperplasia
  – prostatic neoplasms
  – prostatitis

– sexual dysfunction, physiological
  – impotence
  – impotence, vasculogenic

– spermatic cord torsion

– spermatocele

– testicular diseases
  – cryptorchidism
  – orchitis

– tuberculosis, male genital

– varicocele

– tuberculosis, urogenital

– tuberculosis, male genital

– tuberculosis, renal

– urogenital diseases

– urogenital abnormalities
  – bladder exstrophy
  – cryptorchidism
  – epispadias
  – frasier syndrome
  – hypospadias
  – multicystic dysplastic kidney
  – nephritis, hereditary
  – sex differentiation disorders
  – gonadal dysgenesis
  – gonadal dysgenesis, 46,xx
  – gonadal dysgenesis, 46,xy
  – gonadal dysgenesis, mixed
  – turner syndrome
  – hermaphroditism
  – hermaphroditism, true
  – pseudohermaphroditism
  – androgen-insensitivity syndrome
  – denys-drash syndrome
  – kallmann syndrome
  – klinefelter syndrome
  – wagr syndrome

– urogenital neoplasms
  – genital neoplasms, male
  – penile neoplasms
  – prostatic neoplasms
  – testicular neoplasms
  – urologic neoplasms
  – bladder neoplasms
  – kidney neoplasms
  – carcinoma, renal cell
  – wilms tumor
  – denys-drash syndrome
  – wagr syndrome
  – nephroma, mesoblastic
  – ureteral neoplasms
  – urethral neoplasms

– urologic diseases

– bladder diseases
  – bladder calculi
  – bladder exstrophy
  – bladder fistula
  – vesicovaginal fistula
  – bladder neck obstruction
  – bladder neoplasms
  – bladder, neurogenic
  – cystitis
  – cystitis, interstitial
  – vesico-ureteral reflux

– hematuria

– hemoglobinuria

– kidney diseases
  – aids-associated nephropathy
  – anuria
  – diabetes insipidus
  – diabetes insipidus, nephrogenic
  – diabetes insipidus, neurogenic
  – wolfram syndrome
  – diabetic nephropathies
  – fanconi syndrome
  – hepatorenal syndrome
  – hydronephrosis
  – hyperoxaluria, primary
  – hypertension, renal
  – hypertension, renovascular
  – kidney calculi
  – kidney cortex necrosis
  – kidney diseases, cystic
  – medullary sponge kidney
  – multicystic dysplastic kidney
  – polycystic kidney diseases
  – polycystic kidney, autosomal dominant
  – polycystic kidney, autosomal recessive
  – kidney neoplasms
  – carcinoma, renal cell
  – wilms tumor
  – denys-drash syndrome
  – wagr syndrome
  – nephroma, mesoblastic
  – kidney papillary necrosis
  – nephritis
  – glomerulonephritis
  – anti-glomerular basement membrane disease
  – goodpasture syndrome
  – glomerulonephritis, iga
  – glomerulonephritis, membranoproliferative
  – glomerulonephritis, membranous
  – glomerulosclerosis, focal
  – lupus nephritis
  – nephritis, hereditary
  – nephritis, interstitial
  – balkan nephropathy
  – pyelonephritis
  – pyelonephritis, xanthogranulomatous
  – nephrocalcinosis
  – nephrosclerosis
  – nephrosis
  – nephrosis, lipoid
  – nephrotic syndrome
  – perinephritis
  – pyelitis
  – pyelonephritis
  – pyelonephritis, xanthogranulomatous
  – renal artery obstruction
  – renal insufficiency
  – kidney failure
  – kidney failure, acute
  – kidney tubular necrosis, acute
  – kidney failure, chronic
  – renal insufficiency, acute
  – kidney failure, acute
  – kidney tubular necrosis, acute
  – renal insufficiency, chronic
  – kidney failure, chronic
  – renal osteodystrophy
  – renal tubular transport, inborn errors
  – acidosis, renal tubular
  – aminoaciduria, renal
  – cystinuria
  – hartnup disease
  – bartter syndrome
  – cystinosis
  – fanconi syndrome
  – glycosuria, renal
  – hypophosphatemia, familial
  – oculocerebrorenal syndrome
  – pseudohypoaldosteronism
  – tuberculosis, renal
  – uremia
  – hemolytic-uremic syndrome
  – zellweger syndrome

– proteinuria
  – albuminuria

– ureteral diseases
  – ureteral calculi
  – ureteral neoplasms
  – ureteral obstruction
  – ureterocele

– urethral diseases
  – epispadias
  – urethral neoplasms
  – urethral obstruction
  – bladder neck obstruction
  – urethral stricture
  – urethritis
  – reiter disease

– urinary calculi
  – bladder calculi
  – kidney calculi
  – ureteral calculi

– urinary fistula
  – bladder fistula
  – vesicovaginal fistula

– urinary tract infections
  – bacteriuria
  – pyuria
  – schistosomiasis haematobia

– urination disorders
  – enuresis
  – oliguria
  – anuria
  – polyuria
  – urinary incontinence
  – urinary incontinence, stress
  – urinary retention

The list continues at List of MeSH codes (C13).

C12